Organouranium chemistry is the science exploring the properties, structure and reactivity of organouranium compounds, which are organometallic compounds containing a carbon to uranium chemical bond. The field is of some importance to the nuclear industry and of theoretical interest in organometallic chemistry.

History 
The development of organouranium compounds started in World War II when the Manhattan Project required volatile uranium compounds for 235U/238U isotope separation. For example, Henry Gilman attempted to synthesize compounds like tetramethyluranium, and others worked on uranium metal carbonyls, but none of the efforts met success due to organouranium instability. After the discovery of ferrocene in 1951, Todd Reynolds and Geoffrey Wilkinson in 1956 synthesized the uranium metallocene Cp3UCl from sodium cyclopentadienide and uranium tetrachloride as a stable but extremely air-sensitive compound. In it, the U-Cl bond is an ionic bond, while the bonds with the three cyclopentadienyl ligands are covalent of the type found in sandwich compounds with involvement of the uranium 5f atomic orbitals.

Ernst Otto Fischer in 1962 discovered tetracyclopentadienyluranium Cp4U by reaction of KCp with UCl4 (6% yield) as a compound stable in air as a solid but not in solution. A zero molecular dipole moment and IR spectroscopy revealed that it was also a sandwich compound with uranium in a tetrahedral molecular geometry. In 1970, Fischer added Cp3U to the list of known organouranium compounds by reduction of Cp4U with elemental uranium.

In 1968, the group of Andrew Streitwieser prepared the stable but pyrophoric compound uranocene (COT)2U, which has an atom of uranium sandwiched between two cyclooctatetraenide anions (D8h molecular symmetry). The uranium f orbitals interact substantially with the aromatic rings just as the d-orbitals in ferrocene interact with the Cp ligands. Uranocene differs from ferrocene because its HOMO and LUMO are centered on the metal and not on the rings and all reactions thus involve the metal often resulting in ligand - metal cleavage.

Uranocenes show ease of reduction of U(IV) compounds to U(III) compounds; otherwise they are fairly unreactive. A close relative that does have sufficient reactivity, obtained by reaction of uranocene with uranium borohydride is the half-sandwich compound (COT)U(BH4)2 discovered in 1983 by the group of M.J. Ephritikhine. Compounds of this type react in many different ways, for instance alkylation at uranium with organolithium reagents or conversion to hybrid sandwich compounds.

Other organouranium compounds are inverted uranocenes with a COT ligand in between two uranium atoms or uranium sandwich compounds with pentalenide ligands instead of COT ligands.

See also
Organoactinide chemistry
A 1982 review of the organouranium and organothorium chemistry
The Exceptional Diversity of Homoleptic Uranium–Methyl Complexes

References